Ángel Herrera Vera (born August 2, 1957 in Guantánamo) is a Cuban amateur boxer, who won two Olympic gold medals, and the world title at the second World Championships in Belgrade.

First competing in the featherweight (– 57 kg) category, he won the 1976 Olympics as well as the 1978 World Amateur Boxing Championships. He then competed in lightweight (– 60 kg) to win another Olympic gold in 1980, and his second World Title in Munich, West Germany. In 1983 he won a silver medal at the Pan American Games.

Results 
1976 Summer Olympics - Montreal 
 Round of 64: bye
 Round of 32: Defeated Rai Sik (India) KO 1
 Round of 16: Defeated Angel Pacheco (Venezuela) 5-0
 Quarterfinal: Defeated Davey Lee Armstrong (United States) 3-2
 Semifinal: Defeated Juan Paredes (Mexico) 5-0
 Final: Defeated Richard Nowakowski (East Germany) KO 2

1978 World Amateur Championships
Defeated Hirochi Ganobe (Japan) RSC-3
Defeated Viorel Ioana (Romania) walkover
Defeated Roman Gotfryd (Poland) by decision, 5-0
Defeated Bratislav Ristić (Yugoslavia) by decision, 4-1
 
1980 Summer Olympics - Moscow
 Round of 32 Carlo Russolillo (Italy) by decision, 5-0
 Round of 16: Defeated Geza Tumbas (Yugoslavia) by decision, 5-0
 Quarterfinal: Defeated Galsandorj Batbileg (Mongolia) by decision, 5-0
 Semifinal: Defeated Kazimierz Adach (Poland) by decision, 5-0
 Final: Defeated Viktor Demyanenko (USSR) TKO 3

1982 World Amateur Championships
Defeated Juhito Arai (Japan) 5:0
Defeated Kosem Barake (Israel) KO-2
Defeated Lofti Belkhir (Tunisia) RSC-1
Defeated Viorel Ioana (Romania) 4:1
Defeated Pernell Whitaker (United States) 3:2

References

External links

1957 births
Living people
Boxers at the 1979 Pan American Games
Boxers at the 1983 Pan American Games
Boxers at the 1976 Summer Olympics
Boxers at the 1980 Summer Olympics
Olympic boxers of Cuba
Olympic gold medalists for Cuba
Sportspeople from Guantánamo
Olympic medalists in boxing
Medalists at the 1976 Summer Olympics
Medalists at the 1980 Summer Olympics
Cuban male boxers
AIBA World Boxing Championships medalists
Pan American Games silver medalists for Cuba
Pan American Games medalists in boxing
Featherweight boxers
Medalists at the 1983 Pan American Games